A Simple Lie is a 2021 Nigerian romantic comedic film. It was co-produced by Biodun Stephen and David Wade production. The film came four months after her commitment with Anthill Studio's progressive Tailor's Club, and it stars Bisola Aiyeola, Emmanuel Ikubese, Bolaji Ogunmola, Bukunmi Adeaga and Kachi Nnochiri.

Premier 
On 25 March 2021, the film was premiered in the cinema before the official release in July.

Synopsis 
Five friends were secretly having affairs with one another.  They were surprised when it was eventually discovered through the terminal illness of one of them. They thought it was a small lie, but it shows that a small lie matters.

Cast 
Bukunmi Adeaga-Ilori as Fade
Bisola Aiyeola as Boma
Emmanuel Ikubese as Azeem
Kachi Nnochiri as Xavier
Bolaji Ogunmola as Donna

Box office 
According to CEAN, about N346.6 million were realized from ticket sold in the Nollywood industry in March 2021 and  A simple lie was  the 2nd leading film between 25 and 27 March with box office success of N9,809,900.

References 

2021 films
Nigerian comedy films
Nigerian romantic drama films
Nigerian romantic comedy films